Hans Erich Nossack (30 January 1901 – 2 November 1977) was a German writer. Among his works are Spätestens im November (1955), Der jüngere Bruder (1958) and Ein glücklicher Mensch (1975). In 1961 Nossack was awarded the Georg Büchner Prize. One of his most famous works is The End: Hamburg 1943, written 3 months after the bombing of Hamburg by the allies during the Second World War.

Awards
 Georg Büchner Prize 1961

References

1901 births
1977 deaths
German-language writers
German male writers
Recipients of the Pour le Mérite (civil class)
Knights Commander of the Order of Merit of the Federal Republic of Germany